This is a list of cities and towns in Niger. All larger cities are also Communes of Niger.  While often translated as "town", Nigerien communes are simply the third level administrative subdivision of the nation. These can be classified Urban or Rural communes, and while often the administrative unit of a town or city, all areas of the country fall within a commune. Smaller towns and neighborhoods are designated Quarters (Urban) or Villages (Rural).

Largest cities and urban centers

Cities with population over 10,000 according to 2012 census.

Smaller cities and towns

Agadez Region
Aderbissinat 
Aouderas 
Assamakka 
Assodé 
Bilma
Dabaga  
Fachi 
Iferouane 
In-Gall
Madama 
Tegguiada In Tessoum
Timia
Arlit

Diffa Region
Goudoumaria
Bosso
Chétimari
N'Gourti
Kabléwa
N'Guelbély
Gueskérou
Nguigmi

Dosso Region
Dogondoutchi 
Gaya
Koré Maïroua

Maradi Region
Galmi
Guidan Roumji
Mayahi

Tahoua Region
Akoubounou
Bouza
Dabnou 
Korahane
Malbaza Uzine
Tchin-Tabaraden
Galmi

Tillabéri Region
Ayourou
Balléyara
Bani-Bangou
Diagorou 
Karma
Matankari
Ouallam
Tera
Kourteye
Koulikoira

Zinder Region
Cheri
Guidimouni
Kelakam
Mar-Jirgui
Samia
Takieta

Niamey Urban Community
Gaweye
Lamordé
Soudouré

References

External links

 
Niger, List of cities in
Niger
Cities